Mongchontoseong Earthen Fortification is an ancient earthen rampart dating from the Baekje kingdom. It appears to have played the same role in defending the region the fortifications constructed on Mt. Acha. The fortifications of Mongchon Toseong had two unique features: a palisade atop the wall and a moat surrounding its base. They are part of Wiryeseong with Pungnaptoseong. It is located what is now in the Olympic Park of Seoul, South Korea. During the 1988 Summer Olympics, the running portion of the modern pentathlon event were hosted there. A number of important excavations of the site were conducted prior to the construction of the nearby Olympic Park.

References
1988 Summer Olympics official report. Volume 1. Part 1. p. 181.

External links
 Mongchontoseong Earthen Fortification, Seoul at Cultural Heritage Administration of the Republic of Korea

Venues of the 1988 Summer Olympics
Defunct sports venues in South Korea
Olympic modern pentathlon venues
Sports venues in Seoul
Archaeological sites in South Korea
Historic Sites of South Korea
Castles in South Korea
Baekje
Buildings and structures in Songpa District
Olympic Park, Seoul